Clarkebury is a village in Chris Hani District Municipality in the Eastern Cape province of South Africa. It was established in 1830 as a mission station of the Wesleyan Methodist Missionary Society. It was visited by James Backhouse in March 1839.

References

Populated places in the Engcobo Local Municipality
Populated places established in 1830
1830 establishments in the Cape Colony